Kozhikode Sarada (1937 – 8 November 2021) was an Indian Malayalam film actress. She has appeared in over 90 Malayalam films in a career spanning over four decades. She started her career as a stage actress. Sarada made her debut in Malayalam films with the film Angakkuri in 1979. She is known for appearing in films such as Kuttisrank, Anyarude Bhoomi, Sallapam  Anubandham, Ulsavapittennu and Kilichundan Mambapazham. Sarada's role in Sallapam as the mother of Manoj K Jayan was praised by critics. She is also known for appearing in several Malayalam serials. She is a recipient of the Kerala Sangeetha Nataka Akademi Award (2016).

Filmography

TV serials

Dramas
 Sooryan Udhikkatha Rajyam

References

1937 births
2021 deaths
Indian film actresses
Actresses in Malayalam cinema
Actresses from Kerala
People from Kozhikode district
20th-century Indian actresses
21st-century Indian actresses
Actresses in Malayalam television
Indian television actresses
Indian stage actresses
Actresses in Malayalam theatre
Recipients of the Kerala Sangeetha Nataka Akademi Award